Partha may refer to:

 Partha, an epithet of Arjuna, a warrior in the Mahabharata
 Partha, an ancestor of the Shah Mir dynasty of Kashmir
 Partha, a given name (for a list of people with the name, see )
 Partha

See also 
 Parthia (disambiguation)
 Parta (disambiguation)
 Parth (disambiguation)